Virtusa Corporation is an American information technology services company founded in 1996 in Sri Lanka and has its headquarters in Southborough, Massachusetts, United States. The company provides IT consulting, business consulting, systems implementation and application outsourcing services to large enterprises and software vendors.

The company has several delivery centers in India and Sri Lanka with the ones in Hyderabad, Chennai and Colombo being the largest. In February 2021, Baring Private Equity Asia acquired the company for US$2 billion.

Acquisitions
 In November 2009, Virtusa acquired Insource for $7.3 million. Insource is a technology consulting company which specialized in the insurance and healthcare industries. InSource is based in Hartford, Connecticut.
 In 2010, Virtusa acquired ConVista Consulting, LLC, a US-based, privately held market leader in finance transformation, specifically focusing on high volume collection, disbursement, claims and billing systems in BFSI.
 In 2011, Virtusa acquired ALaS Consulting LLC, a financial services consulting firm.
 In November 2013, Virtusa acquired OSB Consulting LLC, a New Jersey-based consulting firm specializing in the financial services and insurance domains, including SAP finance capabilities.
 In January 2014, Virtusa acquired TradeTech Consulting Scandinavia AB and its subsidiaries. TradeTech, headquartered in Stockholm, Sweden, is a consulting and IT services provider specializing in treasury and asset management for major financial institutions in the Nordic countries.
 In April 2015, Virtusa acquired Apparatus, Inc., an IT infrastructure services provider headquartered in Indianapolis, Indiana, US.
 In November 2015, Virtusa acquired a 53% stake in Polaris Consulting & Services Limited, India, a provider of IT solutions primarily to banking and financial services. Virtusa paid $270 million for the firm, which saw more than 7,500 employees join its global undertakings.
 On 12 March 2018, Virtusa Corporation acquired eTouch Systems Corp. and eTouch Systems Pvt. Ltd.

Operations
On 29 March 2018, Virtusa had around 20,000 employees.

Vire with offices throughout US, Europe and Asia, and advanced development centers in the United States, Europe and Asia.

Competition
Some of its key competitors in the offshore IT services industry include Infosys, Wipro, Cognizant, Tech Mahindra, Mphasis, HCL and Tata Consultancy Services.

Community support
The company has a community support program that focuses on education and uses its IT competencies for meeting the needs of the community.
 A team from Virtusa designed and developed a school management system, AKURA, to assist schools with an effective mechanism to manage daily activities. The school management system allows easy and centralised access to student information such as schedules, report cards, attendance, grades, and extracurricular activities, as well as teacher information. Through the system teachers and parents can collaboratively view students' progress. The system has been adopted by schools and universities across different countries, and has been downloaded more than 6,000 times.
 Virtusa facilitated setting up IT laboratories for 50 schools in the Uva province of Sri Lanka. The program was carried out in partnership with a local university in Sri Lanka.
 In 2010, the company leveraged its technology/QA expertise to support the One Laptop Per Child (OLPC) program.
 In the wake of the 2004 tsunami, its employees actively participated in the development of Sahana, an open-source disaster management system.

Offices
 United States - Southborough, Massachusetts (corporate headquarters); Indianapolis, Indiana; New York, New York; Windsor, Connecticut
 Australia - Sydney, Melbourne
 Austria
 Germany - Munich
 Hungary - Budapest
 India - Mumbai, Pune, Hyderabad, Chennai, Bangalore, Coimbatore, Gurgaon.
 Malaysia - Kuala Lumpur
 Netherlands - Amsterdam, The Hague
 Philippines - Taguig City
 Qatar -  Doha
 Singapore
 Sri Lanka - Colombo
 Sweden - Stockholm, Gothenburg
 Switzerland - Zurich
 United Kingdom - London
 United Arab Emirates - Dubai

References

External links
 Virtusa
 Google Finance Profile
 Q&A with Krishan A. Canekeratne, Former C.E.O, Virtusa Corp

1996 establishments in Sri Lanka
2021 mergers and acquisitions
Companies based in Worcester County, Massachusetts
Companies formerly listed on the Nasdaq
Consulting firms established in 1996
Information technology consulting firms of the United States
International information technology consulting firms
Software companies based in Massachusetts
Software companies established in 1996
Software companies of the United States
Software companies of Sri Lanka
Southborough, Massachusetts
Private equity portfolio companies